Cylindera padulosa is a species of tiger beetle in the genus Cylindera. It is part of the subgenus Cylindera and lives in Europe.

References

paludosa
Beetles of Europe